Austromartyria is a genus of small primitive metallic moths in the family Micropterigidae, with a single species.

Species
Austromartyria porphyrodes (Turner, 1932)

References

Micropterigidae
Monotypic moth genera